The following is a list of famous or notable Romanian language poets grouped by period of activity (years link to corresponding "[year] in poetry" articles):

The beginnings
Gheorghe Asachi (1788–1869)
Vasile Cârlova (1809–1832)
Dosoftei (1624–1693)
Anton Pann (1794–1854)
Ienăchiță Văcărescu (1740–1797)
Alecu Văcărescu (1769–1799)

Classical Age
Vasile Alecsandri (1821–1890)
Grigore Alexandrescu (1810–1885)
George Coșbuc (1866–1918)
Mihai Eminescu (1850–1889)
Octavian Goga (1881–1938)
Ștefan Octavian Iosif (1875–1913)
Alexandru Macedonski (1854–1920)
Veronica Micle (1850–1889)
Andrei Mureșanu (1816–1863)
Ion Heliade Rădulescu (1802–1872)
Constantin Stamati (1786–1869)
Carmen Sylva (1843–1916)

Interwar period
Tudor Arghezi (1880–1967)
George Bacovia (1881–1955)
Ion Barbu (1859–1961)
Lucian Blaga (1895–1961)
Nichifor Crainic (1898–1972)
Radu Gyr (1905–1975)
Ion Minulescu (1881–1944)
Gellu Naum (1915–2001)
Ion Pillat (1891–1945)
George Topârceanu (1886–1937)
Tristan Tzara (1896–1963)
Vasile Voiculescu (1884–1963)
Ilarie Voronca (1903 –1946)

Post-war period
George Alboiu (born 1944)
Ioan Alexandru (1941–2000)
A.E. Baconsky (1925–1977)
Cezar Baltag (1939–1997)
Mihai Beniuc (1907–1988)
Ana Blandiana (born 1942)
Emil Brumaru (born 1939)
Paul Celan (1920–1970)
Leonid Dimov (1926–1987)
Mircea Dinescu (born 1950)
Ștefan Augustin Doinaș (1922–2002) 
Șerban Foarță (born 1942)
Eugen Jebeleanu (1911–1991)
Nicolae Labiș (1935–1956)
Gherasim Luca (1913–1994)
Angela Marinescu (born 1941)
Virgil Mazilescu (1942–1984)
Gellu Naum (1915–2001)
Adrian Păunescu (born 1943)
Adrian Popescu (born 1947)
Marin Sorescu (1936–1996)
Nichita Stănescu (1933–1983)
Petre Stoica (1931–2009)
Dorin Tudoran (born 1945)

Contemporary
Constantin Virgil Bănescu (1982–2009)
Ionuț Caragea (born 1975)
Mircea Cărtărescu (born 1956)
Ruxandra Cesereanu (born 1963)
Traian T. Coșovei (born 1954–2014)
Nichita Danilov (born 1952)
Mircea Dinescu (born 1950)
Șerban Foarță (born 1942)
Mariana Marin (1956–2003)
Angela Marinescu (born 1941)
Alexandru Mușina (1954–2013)
Marta Petreu (born 1955)
Cristian Popescu (1959–1995)

Romanian

Poets